Bruce Metcalf (born September 30, 1949 in Amherst, Massachusetts) is an American artist who uses different materials including wood, metal, and plexiglass for his works.

Education 
He received his B.F.A. in Crafts/Metalsmithing in 1972 at Syracuse University. He also majored in Architecture at Syracuse from 1968-1970. From 1972-73 he attended Montana State University and from 1973-74 attended State University of New York at New Paltz. In 1977 he received his Master of Fine Arts in Metalsmithing and Jewelry at Tyler School of Art at Temple University.

Grants, fellowships and awards 
Artist’s Project Grant, Pew Fellowships in the Arts, 2002
 Pew Fellowship in the Arts, 1996

Selected museum collections

Writings 
 Crafts New Borderland: A Grass Roots Movement of Handcraft is Taking Hold

References

 U. Ilse Neumann, American Studio Jewelry Movement - Créateurs de bijoux américains du XXème siècle, in "Bijou, Objet, Corps. In-corporer", L'Harmattan, 2008,

External links
 Artist's website

1949 births
Living people
American sculptors
Syracuse University alumni
Montana State University alumni
State University of New York at New Paltz alumni
Temple University alumni
University of Houston faculty
University of Northern Iowa faculty
Massachusetts College of Art and Design faculty
Colorado State University faculty
Kent State University faculty
Pew Fellows in the Arts
University of the Arts (Philadelphia) faculty
People from Amherst, Massachusetts
Fellows of the American Craft Council